Rebecca Young may refer to:

 Rebecca Young (flag maker), flag maker during the American Revolution
 Rebecca Young (politician) (1934–2008), Wisconsin politician and legislator
 Rebecca Young (rugby) (born 1981), Australian rugby union and rugby league player
 Rebecca Jordan-Young (born 1963), American sociomedical scientist